Nola karelica is a moth of the family Nolidae. It is found from northern and central Fennoscandia to northern Russia, Amur, Siberia and Armenia.

The wingspan is 16–22 mm.

The larvae feed on Salix repens, Rubus chamaemorus and Vaccinium uliginosum.

Subspecies
Nola karelica karelica
Nola karelica tigranula Püngeler, 1902

External links
Species info

karelica
Moths of Asia
Moths of Europe
Fauna of Siberia
Moths described in 1869